The 2015–16 season of the NOFV-Oberliga was the eighth season of the league at tier five (V) of the German football league system and the 26th overall. The league is split in a northern and southern division.

The season began on 14 August 2015 and finished on 12 June 2016, interrupted by a winter break from 19 December to 21 February.

North
The 2015–16 season of the NOFV-Oberliga Nord saw five new clubs in the league, FC Anker Wismar, Tennis Borussia Berlin, 1. FC Frankfurt, CFC Hertha 06 and SV Victoria Seelow, all promoted from the Verbandsligas while no club was relegated from the Regionalliga Nordost to the league.

Top goalscorers
The top goal scorers for the season:

South
The 2015–16 season of the NOFV-Oberliga Süd saw five new clubs in the league, Bischofswerdaer FV, FC International Leipzig, BSG Wismut Gera and FSV Barleben, all promoted from the Verbandsligas while VFC Plauen was relegated from the Regionalliga Nordost.

Top goalscorers
The top goal scorers for the season:

References

External links 
 NOFV-Oberliga Nord at Fupa.net 
 NOFV-Oberliga Süd at Fupa.net 

NOFV-Oberliga seasons
Nofv